Musée Henri-Mathieu  is a museum in Vosges, France. It is located in the former Bruyères Synagogue, which was built with funding from a sponsor, Daniel Osiris, for the Jewish community of Bruyères. The museum now houses a collection of Folk Art. It also includes works by Jean Lurcat, an artist born in Bruyeres.

References 

Museums in Vosges (department)
Decorative arts museums in France
Folk art museums and galleries